American School is an American international school in Sana'a, Yemen. It serves pre-school through grade 12. It was established in 1995, making it the first English medium school accredited by Yemeni authorities.

References

External links

 American School

American international schools in Asia
International schools in Yemen
Educational institutions established in 1995
Sanaa
1995 establishments in Yemen